During the 2017–18 season, SD Huesca are participating in the Spanish LaLiga 123, and the Copa del Rey.

Squad

Transfers
List of Spanish football transfers summer 2017#Huesca

In

Out

Competitions

Overall

Liga

League table

Matches

Copa del Rey

References

SD Huesca seasons
SD Huesca